This is a list of notable people from Kozhikode.

Literature 
 S.K. Pottekkatt - Writer
 Thikkodiyan - Writer
 N.N. Kakkad - Writer
 P. Valsala - Writer
 Akbar Kakkattil - Writer
 Punathil Kunjabdulla - Writer
 Chengalathu Kunhirama Menon - Editor and founder

Politics 
 V.K. Krishna Menon - Diplomat
 K. Kelappan - Freedom Fighter
 K.P. Kesava Menon - Social Leader
Kalingalmadom Rarichan Moopan - Social Leader
 P.P. Ummer Koya - Politician
 C.H. Mohammed Koya- Politician
 P.M.Aboobacker- Politician
 K. Muraleedharan - Politician
 John Mathai - Politician

Entertainment 
 Mona Vasu - Cine actress
 Hareesh Perumanna - Actor
 Biyon - Cine Actor
 Amritha Meera Vijayan - actress
 Bhagyalakshmi - Cine actress
 Nandana - Cine actress
 Anagha LK - Cine actress
 Athira Patel - Cine actress
 Sajan K Ram - Film score composer
 Akhila Sasidharan - Cine actress
 Neena Kurup - Cine actress
 Monisha Unni - Cine actress
 Bindu panicker - Cine actress
 Ranjitha - Cine actress
 Avanthika Mohan - Cine actress
 Nithya Das - Cine actress
 Anjali Menon, film director
 Neeraj Madhav, Cine actor
 Mani Madhava Chakyar, Cine actor
 Ann Augustine - Actress
 Roshan Basheer - Actor
 Balan K. Nair - Cine Actor
 A. Vincent - Film Director
 Girish Puthenchery - Lyricist
 Madhupal - Actor / Director
 Prajin - Cine actress
 I.V. Sasi - Film director
 Jomol - Cine actress
 Sija Rose - Cine actress
 Maria Margaret Sharmilee - Cine actress
 Rajisha Vijayan - Cine actress
 Nellikode Bhaskaran - Actor
 Hariharan - Film director
 P. S. Nivas -(Cinematographer)- Film director
 T. Damodaran - Film script writer
 Deedi Damodaran - Film script writer
 K.P. Ummer - Cine actor
 Kozhikode Abdul Kader - Playbaack singer
 Chandini Sreedharan - Cine Actress
 Kuthiravattam Pappu - Actor
 M.S. Baburaj - Music director
 Mamukkoya - Cine actor
 P.M Taj - Dramatist & Writer
 P.V. Gangadharan - Business man & Film producer
 Sudheesh - Cine actor
 Ranjith - Cine actor, director&Writer
 Augustine - Cine actor
 Swargachitra Appachan - Producer
 Anoop Menon- Cine actor & Writer
 Manu Manjith- Lyricist
 Jenith Kachappilly - Film director
 Vinod Kozhikode - Cine Actor
 Dinanath Puthenchery - Lyricist
 Vinod Kovoor - Cine Actor
 Surabhi Lakshmi - Actress 
 Ansiba Hassan - Actress
 Sasi Kalinga - Actor
 Sreya Jayadeep - Playback Singer
 Mridula Warrier - Playback Singer
 Santhosh Pandit 
 Kozhikode Narayanan Nair Actor
 Street Academics (Hip-hop group)
 Ronson Vincent, Actor
 Sreedevi Unni,Dance, Actress
 Mareena Michael Kurisingal Actress
 Gopika Anil Actress

Sports 
 P. T. Usha - Athlete turned Coach
 Olympian Abdurahiman - Football player, participated in the 1956 Summer Olympics
 Tom Joseph - captain of Indian volleyball team
 Roy Joseph -  Indian Volleyball player
 Mayookha Johny -  Indian Athlete
 V Diju - Indian Badminton Player
 Aparna Balan - Indian Badminton Player
 Arun Vishnu - Indian Badminton Player
 Prasanth Karuthadathkuni - Football player
 Jinson Johnson - Olympian, Indian Athlete
 Kishor Kumar - Former Indian Volleyball Captain
 Rehenesh TP - Football player

Art 
 M.V. Devan - painter, sculptor
 Suveeran - theatre
 Bhanumati Rao - Classical dancer

Religious
Sheikh Abubakr Ahmad
swami chidananda puri
 Maxwell Valentine Noronha - Bishop

Others 
 Thangam Philip - Nutritionist
 Verghese Kurien - Pioneer of white revolution
 Sandeep Unnikrishnan - Soldier
 Ravi Varma of Padinjare Kovilakam - Royal family

References

 
Lists of people from Kerala